Epilobium hirsutum is a flowering plant belonging to the willowherb genus Epilobium in the family Onagraceae. It is commonly known as the great willowherb, great hairy willowherb or hairy willowherb. Local names include codlins-and-cream, apple-pie and cherry-pie.

Description
It is a tall, perennial plant, reaching up to 2 metres in height. The robust stems are profusely hairy with soft spreading hairs. The hairy leaves are 2–12 cm long and 0.5–3.5 cm wide. They are long and thin and are widest below the middle. They have sharply toothed edges and no stalk. The large flowers have four notched petals. These are purple-pink and are usually 10–16 mm long. The stigma is white and has four lobes. The sepals are green.

Distribution
The native range of the species includes North Africa, most of Europe up to southern Sweden, and parts of Asia. It is absent from much of Scandinavia and north-west Scotland. It has been introduced to North America and Australia. It typically grows in wet or damp habitats without dense tree-cover up to 2,500 metres above sea-level. Common habitats include marshland, ditches and the banks of rivers and streams. It flowers from June to September, with a peak in July and August. The flowers are visited by many types of insects, and can be characterized by a generalized pollination syndrome. A number of insects feed on the leaves including the elephant hawkmoth, Deilephila elpenor.

Ecology
Epilobium hirsutum inhabits damp and waste places, river-sides and ditches.

Trichomes
The plant shows glandular trichomes. They are unicellular, without a specialized basal cell. They have a cutinized cell wall and a protruding pore on the top. The upper part of the trichome cell contains flavonoids, e.g. quercitrin and myricitrin.

References

External links
 
Blamey, Marjorie & Grey-Wilson, Christopher (2003) Cassell's Wild Flowers of Britain and Northern Europe, Cassell, London.
Press, J. R.; Sutton, D. A. & Tebbs, B. M. (1981) Field Guide to the Wild Flowers of Britain, Reader's Digest, London.
Tutin, T. G. et al. (1968) Flora Europaea, Volume 2. Cambridge University Press. 

hirsutum
Flora of Europe
Flora of Lebanon
Plants described in 1753
Taxa named by Carl Linnaeus